A by-election was held for the New South Wales Legislative Assembly electorate of Strathfield on 25 May 1996 following the resignation of sitting member, Paul Zammit, to contest federal seat of Lowe at the 1996 election.

On the same day, by-elections were held in the seats of Clarence, Orange, Pittwater and Southern Highlands.

All seats were retained by the Liberal-National Parties, with the exception of Clarence. In Strathfield, the Liberal Party gain a swing of 2.28% on a two-party preferred basis.

Results

Paul Zammit resigned to successfully contest federal seat of Lowe.

See also
Electoral results for the district of Strathfield
List of New South Wales state by-elections

References

1996 elections in Australia
New South Wales state by-elections
1990s in New South Wales